Shishupal Yadav is a member of the Madhya Pradesh Legislative Assembly in India. He was elected from Prithvipur constituency as a member of Bharatiya Janata Party in 2021.

Early life
Shishupal Yadav hails from Uttar Pradesh.

Political career 
Yadav contested as a Samajwadi Party (SP) candidate and lost the 2018 Madhya Pradesh Legislative Assembly election from Prithvipur constituency to Congress candidate Brajendra Singh Rathore. He later quit SP and joined Bharatiya Janata Party in 2021. He was elected from Prithvipur constituency as a Member of the Legislative Assembly of Madhya Pradesh representing Bharatiya Janata Party in 2021 by-polls, necessitated by the death of Rathore, defeating the Congress candidate Nitendra Singh Rathore, son of Brajendra Singh.

References

Bharatiya Janata Party politicians from Madhya Pradesh
Madhya Pradesh MLAs 2018–2023
Living people
People from Niwari district
Year of birth missing (living people)
Samajwadi Party politicians from Madhya Pradesh
University of Allahabad alumni